Julius Tannen (May 16, 1880 – January 3, 1965) was a monologist in vaudeville. He was known to stage audiences for his witty improvisations and creative word games. He had a successful career as a character actor in films, appearing in over 50 films in his 25-year film career. He is probably best known to film audiences from the musical Singin' in the Rain, in which he appears as the man demonstrating a talking picture early in the film.

Early years
After the deaths of his parents, Tannen was placed in an orphanage in Indianapolis, Indiana, when he was seven years old, and he lived there until he was 13. He worked as a private secretary until he was 21.

Career
Tannen never intended to become a performer. As a young man, he was a salesman whose pitch was so good that he began to get offers to entertain at parties. He made his professional vaudeville debut at the age of 21, and soon developed into a monologist, the predecessor to today's stand up comic. He would frequently end his routines before the payoff of the story, allowing the audience to complete it for themselves, and exited with the phrase "My father thanks you, my mother thanks you, my sister thanks you, and I thank you," which was co-opted by the young George M. Cohan.

Tannen made his Broadway debut in 1905, in a musical comedy called Lifting the Lid and went on to appear in three other productions in the next year.  As a vaudevillian, he played the Palace Theatre in New York City – the apex of vaudeville performing – more often that almost any one else, indicating that he was at the peak of his profession. He appeared again on Broadway in 1916, and returned again in 1920, in a comic play with music, Her Family Tree, for which he received credit for writing his own scenes.  Tannen was also seen in two editions of Earl Carroll's Vanities, in 1925 and 1926, and in George White's Scandals. In 1926, he became manager of Vanities in addition to his comedic performances.

The advent of talking pictures created a need in Hollywood for performers with stage experience, and Tannen appeared in his first film in 1935, when he did an uncredited bit in Stranded. This set him upon his 25-year career as a character man, although his work frequently went without credit.

In the 1940s, Tannen was part of Preston Sturges' unofficial "stock company" of character actors, appearing in eight films written and directed by Sturges, with the size of his roles increasing over time. Undoubtedly, Tannen's most memorable and prominent performance came at the age of 72, when he portrayed a man demonstrating the technology of talking pictures in a film-within-the-film in Singin' in the Rain in 1952.

Tannen continued to appear in films until 1959, when he was seen in an uncredited role in director John Sturges' Last Train from Gun Hill. He continued to work until he suffered a stroke in 1964.

Personal life and death 
When Tannen was 19 years old, he married Beatrice Muhleman. The couple, who had two sons, Charles and William, were married  for 60 years, until her death in 1960. Tannen died at the age of 84, on January 3, 1965, at the Motion Picture Country Home in Woodland Hills, California.

Legacy
Lucille Ball said that seeing Tannen perform in her hometown of Jamestown, New York when she was a child inspired her to go into show business.

His sons, William Tannen and Charles Tannen, were both successful film and television actors; William had a recurring role on The Life and Legend of Wyatt Earp; Charles later became a television executive.

Partial filmography

Stranded (1935) - Man at Train Terminal (uncredited)
King of Burlesque (1936) - Auctioneer (uncredited)
Collegiate (1936) - Detective Browning
Half Angel (1936) - City Editor
The Road to Glory (1936) - Lt. Tannen
Sins of Man (1936) - Advertising Man (uncredited)
36 Hours to Kill (1936) - Dr. Borden
Sing, Baby, Sing (1936) - Kansas City Radio Station Manager (uncredited)
Dimples (1936) - Hawkins
Pigskin Parade (1936) - Dr. Burke
Reunion (1936) - Sam Fisher
Stowaway (1936) - First Mate Jenkins
One in a Million (1936) - Chapelle
Love Is News (1937) - Logan
Fair Warning (1937) - Mr. Taylor
Mama Runs Wild (1937) - C. Preston Simms
Love Is a Headache (1938) - Mr. Hillier
Goodbye Broadway (1938) - Caldeway (uncredited)
A Man to Remember (1938) - Hospital Administrator (uncredited)
The Lady and the Mob (1939) -Train Conductor (uncredited)
The Magnificent Fraud (1939) - American Businessman (uncredited)
Danger Flight (1939) - Dawson
Remember the Night (1940) - Jury Member (uncredited)
The Lone Wolf Strikes (1940) - Hotel Manager (uncredited)
The Mortal Storm (1940) - 3rd Colleague
The Lady in Question (1940) - Judge of the Court (uncredited)
Christmas in July (1940) - Mr. Zimmerman
Bitter Sweet (1940) - Schlick's Companion (uncredited)
No, No, Nanette (1940) - Disturbed Airline Passenger (uncredited)
The Lady Eve (1941) - Lawyer (uncredited)
Sullivan's Travels (1941) - Public Defender (uncredited)
Confessions of Boston Blackie (1941) - Dr. Crane (uncredited)
Harvard, Here I Come! (1941) - Prof. Anthony
The Ghost of Frankenstein (1942) - Sektal (uncredited)
Two Yanks in Trinidad (1942) - Doctor (uncredited)
The Big Street (1942) - Judge Bamberger (uncredited)
The Palm Beach Story (1942) - Proprietor of Store (uncredited)
The Miracle of Morgan's Creek (1943) - Mr. Rafferty
The Great Moment (1944) - Professor Charles T. Jackson
The House of Frankenstein (1944) - Hertz
Nob Hill (1945) - Minor Role (uncredited)
The Dolly Sisters (1945) - Man (uncredited)
A Scandal in Paris (1946) - Bank of Paris Manager (uncredited)
The Sin of Harold Diddlebock (1947) - Nearsighted Banker
Unfaithfully Yours (1948) - O'Brien
Always Leave Them Laughing (1949) - Mr. H. Clurman (uncredited)
Grounds for Marriage (1951) - Music Editor (uncredited)
The People Against O'Hara (1951) - Toby Baum (uncredited)
Singin' in the Rain (1952) - Man in Talking Pictures Demonstration (uncredited)
Clash by Night (1952) - Waiter (uncredited)
Carrie (1952) - John (uncredited)
Loving You (1957) - Frank - Manager of Buckhorn Tavern (uncredited)
I Married a Woman (1958) - Tim Smith - Sutton Advertising (uncredited)
Once Upon a Horse... (1958) - Train Conductor (uncredited)
The Last Hurrah (1958) - Mr. Kowalsky (uncredited)
Last Train from Gun Hill (1959) - Horseshoe Cleaning Man (uncredited) (final film role)

References

External links 
 
 
 
 

1880 births
1965 deaths
Jewish American male actors
American male comedians
American male film actors
American male stage actors
Vaudeville performers
Male actors from New York City
20th-century American male actors
Comedians from New York City
20th-century American comedians